KFST may refer to:

 KFST-FM, a radio station (94.3 FM) in Fort Stockton, Texas, United States
 KFST (AM), a radio station (860 AM) in Fort Stockton, Texas, United States